Zmist (also known as Z0mbie.Mistfall) is a metamorphic computer virus  created by the Russian virus writer known as Z0mbie. It was the first virus to use a technique known as "code integration". In the words of Ferrie and Ször:

This virus supports a unique new technique: code integration.
The Mistfall engine contained in it is capable of
decompiling Portable Executable files to [their] smallest
elements, requiring 32 MB of memory. Zmist will insert
itself into the code: it moves code blocks out of the way,
inserts itself, regenerates code and data references, including
relocation information, and rebuilds the executable.

Variants
Zmist.gen!674CD7362358  -  discovered in 2012.
ZMist!IK - discovered 2011 - 2012.
Zmist.A  -  discovered in 2006 - 2007.

See also
Simile, a well-known metamorphic virus
Computer virus
Comparison of computer viruses

References

External links
"Hunting for metamorphic", Metamorphic viruses description by Ször and Ferrie
"Virus.Win32.ZMist.Predetect" by Secure List.

Windows file viruses